Boston Jenkins Drayton (1821–1865) was a Liberian politician and Lutheran minister who served as the 3rd Chief Justice of Liberia from 1861 until 1864. He had previously served as the final Governor of the Republic of Maryland from 1855 until its annexation by Liberia on 18 March 1857.

Born in Charleston, South Carolina, in 1821, Drayton served as the black minister at St. John's Lutheran Church in Charleston under Minister John Bachman. In 1845, Drayton was sent by Bachman to serve as a missionary in Cape Palmas in the newly formed Republic of Maryland. He later pursued a career in politics, becoming the Lieutenant Governor of Maryland under Governor William A. Prout.

In December 1855, Drayton ousted Prout, who had become increasingly unpopular, and assumed the governorship, later being unanimously elected in April 1856 as the Governor of Maryland. By December of that year, relations between the American settlers and the native Grebo population had deteriorated to the point of open warfare. As Maryland had less than 1,000 settlers and had poor financing, Drayton appealed to Liberia for assistance. In response, Liberian President Joseph Jenkins Roberts dispatched a militia force to put down the Grebo rebellion. Drayton soon negotiated the annexation of Maryland by Liberia and stepped down as governor on 18 March 1857.

Drayton was later appointed Chief Justice of Liberia by President Stephen Allen Benson in 1861, serving until stepping down in 1864. He died in 1865 as a result of an accidental drowning when his canoe capsized near Cape Palmas.

References

Chief justices of Liberia
Americo-Liberian people
1821 births
1866 deaths
Clergy from Charleston, South Carolina
People from Maryland County
Liberian Lutheran clergy
19th-century American Lutheran clergy
American emigrants to Liberia
Deaths by drowning
Governors of the Republic of Maryland
19th-century Liberian judges